In 2003–04, Associazione Calcio Milan managed to claim their first Serie A title since 1998–99. Arguably, this was the pinnacle of Carlo Ancelotti's Milan side, as the players proved they had the ability to perform effectively for the whole season.

Roma both scored more and conceded fewer goals than Milan, but the effectiveness the Milanese showed in tight matches ensured their winning margin was edged out to a stable 11 points. The title was sealed against Roma at home, with a goal by Andriy Shevchenko proving enough for a 1–0 win.

In the Champions League, Milan failed to defend their European title, as they were knocked out in the quarter-finals, losing 4–0 to Deportivo La Coruña in the second leg, after they had won 4–1 at home.

Individually, the biggest surprise was how the Brazilian trequartista Kaká seamlessly found his way into the Italian game, being a key player in Milan's success. The other two arrivals, Cafu and Giuseppe Pancaro, also integrated well with the team. Andriy Shevchenko was crowned as European Footballer of the Year on the back of his successful season. Tactically, Ancelotti used two different formations throughout the season; the 4–4–2 diamond (or 4–1–2–1–2) and the 4–3–2–1.

Players

Squad information
Squad at end of season

Transfers

Left club during season

Reserve squad

Competitions

Supercoppa Italiana

UEFA Super Cup

Serie A

League table

Results by round

Matches

Coppa Italia

Round of 16

Quarter-finals

Semi-finals

UEFA Champions League

Group stage

Knockout phase

Round of 16

Quarter-finals

Intercontinental Cup

Statistics

Players statistics

Goalscorers
  Andriy Shevchenko 24 (1 pen.)
  Jon Dahl Tomasson 12 (1 pen.)
  Kaká 10
  Andrea Pirlo 6 (3 pen.)

References

A.C. Milan seasons
Milan
2004